Festuca heterophylla, the various-leaved fescue, is a species of perennial plant from family Poaceae that is native to southern Europe. It is also grows in Asia and in the US states of New York and Virginia.

References

heterophylla
Flora of Asia
Flora of Europe